The Prince William Award is a character and resilience award programme for children in the United Kingdom aged 6–14.  Founded on 1 March 2017 by Prince William.  It is the first such award programme in his name.

The award is delivered in partnership with schools at four different age range levels: Pioneer, Explorer, Trailblazer and Voyager. The levels explore 5 key themes and 28 guiding principles.

The five key themes are:

 Personal Development
 Relationships
 Working together
 Community
 Environment

References

English awards